The 1977 Tour of the Basque Country was the 17th edition of the Tour of the Basque Country cycle race and was held from 28 March to 1 April 1977. The race was won by José Antonio González Linares of the Kas team.

General classification

References

1977
Bas